Zaat is a 1971 American independent science fiction horror film produced and directed by Don Barton, and co-written by Barton, Lee O. Larew and Ron Kivett. Produced on a $50,000 budget, the film stars Marshall Grauer as a mad scientist who aims to transform himself into a mutation to seek revenge on those who spurned him.

Critical reception has been predominantly negative, with criticism directed at the film's script, acting, and poor monster design. Cited as one of the worst films ever made, it gained significant exposure when it was used in an episode of the movie-mocking television series Mystery Science Theater 3000 in May 1999, under its alternate title Blood Waters of Dr. Z.

Plot 
In his laboratory, mad scientist Dr. Kurt Leopold contemplates his former colleagues' derision for his "formula", "ZaAt", a compound that can transform humans into sea creature hybrids. He injects himself with the serum and immerses himself in a tank, emerging as a catfish-like monster. In his new form, Leopold releases walking catfish across the town's lakes and rivers, and releases "Zaat" into the water supply, rendering many of the townspeople ill. All the while, Sheriff Lou Krantz and marine biologist Rex Baker investigate the strange happenings with the local catfish and the waterways.

Leopold turns his attention to killing those who mocked his work. He murders former colleague Maxson and his family on a boat, followed by associate Ewing in his home. Leopold returns to the lake where he kidnaps a young female camper. Taking her back to his lab, the doctor straps her in a mesh basket beside the large water tank, with the intention to make her his mate. However, due to her struggling, the equipment malfunctions, and her corpse, partially transformed, is pulled from the tank.

Baffled by the deaths, Rex contacts an organization known as INPIT, which sends scientists Martha Walsh and Walker Stevens to the town. Following kidnapping Martha, Leopold heads towards his lab, followed by Walker, who has picked up Leopold's radioactive trail. The doctor arrives at the lab with Martha, where Rex and Lou happen to be searching. A fight ensues and Leopold fatally wounds them. He injects Martha with "Zaat", readies her to be dunked into the tank, and makes his getaway with canisters of the compound. Martha's transformation fails, and she is saved from the tank by a dying Rex, although she appears to be in a trance and immediately follows Leopold into the sea.

Cast

Production
Jacksonville, Florida resident Don Barton serves as director, producer and co-writer, alongside Lee O. Larew and Ron Kivett.

Filming took place over one month in 1970 on a $75,000 budget, $50,000 for production and $25,000 for to film prints and advertising. Locations include various Florida locales, such as Rainbow Springs, Green Cove Springs and Marineland.

Release
The film was originally distributed by Horizon Films. It was shown in Jacksonville as well as in theaters in mostly southern states during its original theatrical release. It was also shown in a theater in Manhattan's 42nd Street through Aquarius Releasing, known for distributing exploitation films. It was shown in the theater for one day before being pulled, with the movie only making $200. In 1983, the movie was re-released by Capitol Productions. In 1985, it was released under the title Attack of the Swamp Creatures, which had new cast and production credits added to it. Zaat was originally released on video by ThrillerVideo under the Attack of the Swamp Creature title, with popular horror hostess Elvira hosting and spoofing the film throughout. In 2001, the film was released on video for its thirtieth anniversary under the Zaat title. Limited to five hundred copies, the videotapes were autographed by Don Barton and co-writer Ron Kivett.

In February 2012, it was later issued on DVD and Blu-ray for the first time by Film Chest and HD Cinema Classics. Digitally restored in HD and transferred from original 35mm elements, the DVD/Blu-ray combo pack also contained a feature-length audio commentary by cast and crew, the original 35mm trailer, television spots, outtakes, a radio interview, a before-and-after restoration demo, and an original movie art postcard.

Reception
Dennis Schwartz from Ozus' World Movie Reviews, grading the film on an A+ to F scale, awarded the film a "C". In his review, Schwartz called the film "[an] overlong and boring mad scientist monster film", criticizing the film's acting, direction, excessive use of filler scenes, and an unimaginative climax. Dave Sindelar on his Fantastic Movie Musings and Ramblings wrote, "The concept is ridiculous (let’s face it – catfish just aren’t scary), the plot is primitive, the acting is very weak, and the direction isn’t good. Nonetheless, the film is full of unintentionally funny dialogue, the use of sound and music is unique (if wrongheaded), and it’s more charmingly primitive than excruciatingly dull." Robert L. Jerome from Cinefantastique, while noting the movie had the right ideas in it, called it a "fiasco" for its implementation. VideoHound's Golden Movie Retriever by Jim Craddock gave it zero stars. Keith Phipps for The A.V. Club described the film as being simultaneously "Awful" and "Awfully charming".

Critic Jeffrey Kauffman said, "this is the sort of film Ed Wood, Jr. might have made—on a bad day" and added, "Lovers of fantastically bad films rate Zaat one of the worst". Patrick Naugle of DVD Verdict stated, "The acting in Zaat is below subpar. Actors seem to be whispering their lines and trying hard not to fully comprehend that they're in one of the worst films ever made", while Michael Rubino of DVD Verdict also claimed, "Zaat may be one of the worst films ever created". NPR called it a "sci-fi fiasco" when it became "the winner — er, loser —" on IMDbs Bottom 100.

Mystery Science Theater 3000
Cult television series Mystery Science Theater 3000 featured Zaat in a season 10 episode under the title Blood Waters of Dr. Z. The episode, which originally aired May 2, 1999, mocked the film's low-budget effects and general tepidity. Director Don Barton was reportedly annoyed with MST3K for mocking his movie, but later clarified that the only reason he was annoyed was that Syfy (then known as the Sci-Fi Channel) had failed to secure the proper rights to the film. Barton issued a cease and desist and a lawsuit, so Syfy pulled the episode, and only reran it twice two years later when they had cleared the issue with Barton out of court.

In 2010, Shout! Factory released the MST3K episode as part of the "Volume XVII" DVD collection of the series, along with The Crawling Eye, The Beatniks, and The Final Sacrifice. The boxset was later discontinued and the episode was repackaged with "The Lost and Found Collection" in 2018.

See also
 List of American films of 1971
 List of films considered the worst
 Creature from the Black Lagoon

References

Citations

Bibliography

External links 
 
 
 
 
 MST3K version on ShoutFactoryTV

1971 films
American science fiction horror films
1970s English-language films
Films shot in Jacksonville, Florida
Mad scientist films
American natural horror films
1970s monster movies
1971 horror films
1970s science fiction horror films
American monster movies
1970s American films